The Brighton by-election of 1889 was held on 25 October 1889 after the death of the incumbent Conservative MP William Tindal Robertson.  It was retained by the Conservative candidate Gerald Loder.

References

By-elections to the Parliament of the United Kingdom in East Sussex constituencies
1889 elections in the United Kingdom
1889 in England
19th century in Sussex